Général de brigade Charles André Merda, baron Meda (10 January 1770 – 8 September 1812) was a French soldier. A National Guardsman in the Parisian National Guard from September 1789, then a gendarme from 1794, he participated in the arrest of Maximilien de Robespierre on the night of 9/10 thermidor Year II (27 July 1794) and claimed to have fired the pistol shot which broke Robespierre's jaw and hit Couthon's helper in his leg.

Under the First French Empire he was made a baron and changed his surname to Meda (sometimes spelt Méda). Whilst fighting as colonel of the 1er régiment de chasseurs à cheval (France), he was mortally wounded by a musket ball at the battle of Borodino and was made a general on his deathbed. He was survived by his wife and two sons.

Bibliography
 Jean-François Fayard, Alfred Fierro et Jean Tulard, Histoire et dictionnaire de la Révolution française 1789-1799, Robert Laffont, Paris, 1998, p. 981.
 Michael J. Sydenham, Leonard Bourdon. The Career of a Revolutionary. 1754‑1807, Waterloo (Ontario), Wilfrid Laurier University Press, 1999.

1770 births
1812 deaths
People of the French Revolution
French military personnel killed in the Napoleonic Wars
Barons of France
Recipients of the Legion of Honour
Military personnel from Paris
French commanders of the Napoleonic Wars